SmarTrip is a contactless stored-value smart card payment system managed by the Washington Metropolitan Area Transit Authority (WMATA). The Maryland Transit Administration (MTA) uses a compatible payment system called CharmCard. A reciprocity agreement between the MTA and WMATA allows either card to be used for travel on any of the participating transit systems in the Baltimore-Washington metropolitan area. Unlike traditional paper farecards or bus passes, SmarTrip/CharmCard is designed to be permanent and reloadable; the term "SmarTrip" may refer to both payment systems unless otherwise noted.

WMATA began using SmarTrip for payment on Metrorail in 1999 followed shortly by Metrobus and Metro parking lots. It was later extended to other public transit systems throughout the region.  Although WMATA initially drew criticism due to the limited number of SmarTrip sales locations, distribution has expanded to local convenience stores and supermarkets. By late 2012 all Metrorail stations were equipped with SmarTrip vending machines.

In October 2010, WMATA announced that it was working on a replacement card system because the company that makes SmarTrip cards had stopped producing the existing generation. A new generation of the card with modernized chip technology was launched in 2012. Beginning in 2021, the first-generation SmarTrip cards are being phased out as new faregates are installed that do not support the earlier technology.

In 2014, WMATA began a pilot program with Accenture to revamp the SmarTrip payments, with the goal of an open payment system working with contactless credit cards, government IDs, new transit cards, and more. However, the pilot was terminated and the full proposal was cancelled due to lower-than-expected mobile payment adoption and budget constraints.

Instead, in 2018, WMATA announced that contactless mobile payments would be coming to Metro, this time through a closed system that emulates the physical smart card and works with current fare collection equipment. The reduced scope of the project lowered costs dramatically, while constraining users to loading a balance on a SmarTrip account instead of paying directly from a credit/debit card. Mobile payments through Apple Pay were added in 2020, with Google Pay support following in 2021.

Since March 6, 2016, SmarTrip cards are the only payment method accepted on Metrorail; paper farecards are no longer valid.

Overview 

SmarTrip cards are 3⅜ by 2⅛ inches (85.7 mm × 54.0 mm), the same size as a credit card or driver's license.  The card is brought into close proximity with a circular target on the top or side of each faregate rather than inserted into a slot. Because the card has a radio-frequency identification (RFID) chip inside, it does not need to be touched directly to the target, just held near it; thus the card can be scanned while still inside a wallet or purse passed over the target, affording some speed and convenience over the paper farecards which were physically inserted into a slot. Unlike some systems in which only the card number is stored on the chip and is linked to an account on a network which contains the remaining value, in this system, the remaining value is stored on the card itself, not on a network. Therefore, the card must be present to reload it, and when adding the card to a smart device, the card must remain in close proximity to the device during a process in which the data is deleted from the card and stored on the device. This means that once the card is added to a device, the physical card becomes unusable, and only one device can carry it at a time. In the Metrorail system, using the card to activate the target by will display the value remaining as the faregate opens, both when entering and exiting.  On Metrobuses, the farebox will audibly beep and display the remaining value.  In all cases, the appropriate fare is deducted automatically, accounting for any applicable transfers and discounts.

In an effort to reduce fraud and waste, Metro announced in October 2008 that it would be eliminating paper bus transfers effective January 4, 2009. All riders who wished to take advantage of reduced-fare transfers were required to pay using SmarTrip. Paper bus passes were eliminated in January 2011 and passes are now only available on SmarTrip.

For SmarTrip, pass rules are different from CharmCard.  All Metrorail passes are now available on SmarTrip. These include One-Day, 7-Day, and 28-Day fast passes valid for unlimited travel on Metrorail. A 7-Day Short Trip Pass is also sold, allowing unlimited off-peak rides, and unlimited peak rides for trips costing up to $3.50, with the difference in fare deducted from the stored value on the card if necessary. CharmCard allows a maximum of two of each pass to be stored, so two day passes and two monthly passes, plus cash, can be stored on the card.

Metro also sells SmarTrip cards that are preloaded with a One-Day rail pass online for the same price as just the pass alone ($14 since July 1, 2012), including all of the commemorative SmarTrip cards issued since 2009.

Standard cards can be purchased at vending machines within all Metrorail stations, at Metro sales offices, selected retail stores, and online. The purchase price includes $2 for the card itself plus an initial fare value, which varies depending on where they are purchased: cards purchased at stations cost $10 ($2 for the card and $8 fare value), while those purchased online cost either $10 or $30 ($2 for the card and $8 or $28 fare value). The cards can be reloaded using farecard vending machines or using cash at fareboxes onboard buses. Until 2016, riders could also add value to their SmarTrip cards by trading in paper farecards (a used farecard up to $20, or an unused farecard of any value). There is a difference between SmarTrip and CharmCard on the maximum value that can be stored on the card: SmarTrip can store up to $300 in value, while CharmCard can store up to $200.

SmarTrip and CharmCard have different qualifications for inter-system usage, e.g. using CharmCard on non-MTA providers, and using SmarTrip on MTA. Passes and non-cash loads (such as employee transit benefits) are stored on the card in a separate "purse" from cash loads. Purse benefits can only be used on the issuing system for that benefit, so a day pass issued by MTA on either a CharmCard or SmarTrip will only be valid on MTA, and a WMATA-issued monthly pass will not be valid on MTA even if it was loaded on a CharmCard. This does mean it is possible to have identical or different passes (like a monthly pass from one and a day pass from the other) from both WMATA and MTA simultaneously loaded on the same card. Monthly transit benefits provided by an employer will only be valid for whichever system the employer is registered with, so an employer who is registered to provide transit benefits with WMATA will only grant benefits usable on WMATA and Washington, DC-area transit providers, even if the benefits are loaded on a CharmCard. Cash loaded on either card is valid on both WMATA and MTA vehicles. This also means purse funds cannot be used for cash equivalents, so a person who is authorized for a monthly bus pass in employee benefits cannot use that benefit to pay for rail travel or a day pass.

Discounted (half-fare) cards have different rules for SmarTrip and CharmCard. SmarTrip for seniors and the disabled may only be purchased in person from a Metro agent or authorized sales office, and the person must show ID and for a disabled rider, proof of disability (either WMATA Disabled ID or Medicare card.) CharmCard for seniors and disabled are only available from the MTA reduced fare office at 6 St. Paul Street in downtown Baltimore, with similar requirements (proof of age or disability). Also, while WMATA charges a $2 fee plus the amount to load in value for senior/disabled SmarTrip card, MTA merely requires at least $2 in value to be initially loaded onto a senior/disabled CharmCard; MTA waives any fee for the card.

"Exit fare" machines (used with paper farecards) previously did not accept SmarTrip, and riders with insufficient value to pay their fare were allowed to exit the system with any negative balance. This negative balance must, however, be paid before the card may be used again to enter the system. In addition, the card must contain sufficient value to pay the full fee in order to exit a Metro parking lot. Since SmarTrip owners were allowed to exit the system with an unlimited negative balance, the Metro Board had previously rejected proposals to reduce the price of SmarTrip cards from $5 down to $2.50.
Starting September 1, 2012, Metro began offering $3 rebates to customers who registered their cards online after purchase. The cards still cost $5, but a $3 credit was refunded to the card five days after first use. Also starting September 1, riders have been required to have a minimum balance of $1.20 on their SmarTrip cards (35¢ for half-fare senior/disabled cards) in order to enter the Metrorail system, which reduced the possible negative balance upon exit.
Effective October 1, 2013, the price of the card was reduced to $2, the rebate program was discontinued, and the maximum permitted negative balance upon exit was set at $1.50, with riders who would exceed this being required to use the Exitfare machines to add value to their cards.

SmarTrip cards comply with the ISO/IEC 14443 Type B standard. A microchip contained within the card stores its value, as well as the rider's most recent entry and exit points, and a unique identifier. However, the unique identifier is not linked to a person's name or identity, unless one registers the card online. Registering SmarTrip cards allows riders to recover their remaining balance (minus a $5 replacement fee), should the card be lost, stolen, or damaged. The unique identifier also allows workers enrolled in the SmartBenefits program, which allows employers to subsidize employee transportation costs tax-free, to credit their monthly benefits to their cards.

The SmarTrip system was built and designed by Cubic Transportation Systems, Inc., a subsidiary of San Diego-based Cubic Corporation.  As of October 2010 Cubic is reportedly no longer producing the cards.
In December 2010, WMATA issued a request for proposals for a replacement system. The new payment system is expected to use federal employee badges and certain smart phones in addition to the stored value cards. In January 2014 WMATA announced that the contract for the new system was awarded to Accenture.

In May 2012, the transit agency announced the launch of a new generation of SmarTrips cards after the manufacturer stopped producing the earlier generation. The new cards operate and appear identical to customers except for being slightly thinner and cheaper to produce. The newer generation cards can be identified based on serial numbers beginning with "0167".

History
SmarTrip was the first contactless smart card for transit in the United States when WMATA began selling SmarTrip cards on May 18, 1999. By 2004, 650,000 SmarTrip cards were in circulation. On November 12, 2002, the first SmarTrip readers were used on Metrobuses. In May 2004, SmarTrip readers were introduced at parking garage gates. In December 2010, 1,800,000 SmarTrip cards were in use. In February 2011, WMATA replaced the antennas on all Metrorail faregates to improve the speed and range of its faregates' SmarTrip processing. On September 1st, 2020, Apple and WMATA enabled SmarTrip cards to be added to Apple Pay through the Wallet app. Later on June 8, 2021, Google Pay on Android devices became supported as well.

Kids Ride Free

DC One Card
In May 2011, WMATA and the District of Columbia Department of Transportation started a pilot project to give students in the DC Public Schools "DC One Cards" which are SmarTrip compatible. The new cards serve as both a student identification card and provide reduced or free Metro fares during student commuting hours. The cards are intended to address youth behavior problems in Metrorail stations.

SmarTrip Card
In the summer of 2018, the DC One Card Kids Ride Free program was replaced by the SmarTrip Kids Ride Free Program due to difficulties in activating the DC One Cards. All students who live in the District of Columbia, attend a public, charter, or private school in the District of Columbia, and are between the ages of 5 and 21 are eligible for a Kids Ride Free SmarTrip Card. The Kids Ride Free Card, a normal SmarTrip card with a large silver Kids Ride Free sticker on it, allows students to ride the Washington Metro, Metrobus, and the DC Circulator for free. The DC One Card Program officially terminated on October 1, 2018.

Design 
On the front of the standard SmarTrip card is a stylized picture of a Metrorail car and Metrobus in front of representations of the Washington Monument, United States Capitol, and stylized versions of classical architecture found in Washington, D.C. The Metro logo appears in the bottom left. A "Senior" SmarTrip is also available that automatically calculates applicable discounted fares for senior citizens (age 65+). The design is identical to the standard SmarTrip except that the card is printed in shades of bright yellow and brown, instead of blue and green. Since the Senior SmarTrip allows for discounted fares, the card may only be purchased in person with a valid ID from a Metro sales office or authorized vendor.

On March 27, 2016, Metro unveiled a new SmarTrip card design, to celebrate the 40th anniversary of the Metrorail system opening.

Beginning November 2016, Metro Access cards, which permit use of Metro Access Paratransit and free trips on Metrobus and Metrorail, were replaced with a special personalized SmarTrip card with the user's photograph and the Metro Access logo appearing on the front of the card. A companion SmarTrip card is included to allow a companion to also ride free along with the disabled person.

Promotional designs 
The first two promotional SmarTrip cards were issued in 2008 to commemorate the opening of the newly built stadium of the Washington Nationals, Nationals Park. Special SmarTrip cards commemorating the inauguration of President Barack Obama were issued in January 2009 and 2013.  In July 2013, a special July 4 commemorative SmarTrip card was introduced.

In June 2014, Metro celebrated the 125th anniversary of the National Zoo by issuing commemorative SmarTrip cards featuring "popular zoo baby residents."

In July 2014, a commemorative SmarTrip card was issued to celebrate the opening of the Silver Line.

Criticism 

An early criticism of the SmarTrip cards had been that they were only sold at suburban Metrorail stations, online, a few selected retailers, and Metro sales offices. However, in 2008, Metro reached an agreement with CVS/pharmacy to sell the cards at 187 DC-area locations in an effort to increase SmarTrip use. The SmarTrip cards are also sold at area grocery store chains. In late 2012 WMATA installed SmarTrip vending machines at all Metrorail stations.

A number of SmarTrip features that were supposed to be introduced in 2005 by SmarTrip's creator, Cubic Transportation Systems, were not fully implemented until 2012. Initially, riders could only add value to a SmarTrip card at Metrorail stations or by using cash while boarding a Metrobus. In November 2008, after years of delays, WMATA announced that customers would have the ability to add funds to their SmarTrip cards online by September 2009, but that deadline was missed. WMATA did launch SmarTrip's online reload feature in September 2011. WMATA allowed customers to load a seven-day unlimited Metrorail pass to their SmarTrip cards in April 2012.

All trips made with a SmarTrip card, with the exception of bus transfers and passes, are charged as individual one-way fares. WMATA offers discounted rail and bus passes to customers who make several trips in one day, or many trips, or many short trips, in a seven-day period or calendar month; however, SmarTrip users must manually load each transit pass onto their SmarTrip cards or sign up for an autoload of the pass in advance. This is in contrast to the Oyster card system on the London Underground, for example, where fares are automatically capped to ensure that customers never pay more than the cost of a one-day pass each day.

There have been complaints when customers' cards cease to work as a result of placing the card in proximity to metal or physically damaging the card. In such cases Metro guarantees that the fund balance on the card will be transferred to a new card. However, customers have complained that WMATA has not been processing such balance transfers promptly.

Parking
After reports of widespread theft by employees of Metro's parking contractor, Penn Parking, WMATA announced that as part of a new cashless parking payment system, SmarTrip would be the only way to pay for parking at Metro-operated garages and lots effective June 28, 2004. The decision prompted complaints that Metro was inconveniencing its many customers, including tourists and other infrequent users, who did not own a SmarTrip card. In April 2007, WMATA began testing the use of credit cards to pay for parking at six Metro stations, avoiding the need to pay for parking with SmarTrip cards at those stations. The sites are Anacostia on the Green Line, Shady Grove on the Red Line, Vienna and New Carrollton on the Orange Line, and Franconia-Springfield and Largo Town Center on the Blue Line. One exit lane at each station accepts credit card payments through a reader next to the existing SmarTrip card target. WMATA has since announced that it will make at least one credit card exit lane available at all Metro pay-on-exit parking facilities.

Participating systems 
The following is a list of transit systems that accept the SmarTrip card for payment. The Maryland Transit Administration's CharmCard uses a compatible payment system from the same manufacturer. A reciprocity agreement allows patrons to use either payment card to travel on any of the participating systems throughout the Baltimore-Washington Metropolitan Area. However, digital SmarTrip cards stored in Apple Wallet will not work on any Baltimore MTA vehicle.

*Select routes do not accept SmarTrip as payment.

Other area transportation 
The following systems serve the Baltimore–Washington Area, but do not currently accept SmarTrip or CharmCard as payment

*Select routes do accept SmarTrip.

**SmarTrip can be used to purchase a paper or digital ticket in lieu of a credit or debit card through certain DC area employers enrolled in the SmartBenefits program.

***This service is free to all users and does not collect fares.

Transfers

References

External links 
 SmarTrip home page
 Cubic Transportation Systems

Fare collection systems in the United States
Contactless smart cards
Washington Metropolitan Area Transit Authority